Ammar Al-Tamimi (born September 12, 1988) is a professional squash player who represents Kuwait. He reached a career-high world ranking of World No. 100 in February, 2012.

References 

1988 births
Living people
Kuwaiti squash players
Asian Games medalists in squash
Asian Games bronze medalists for Kuwait
Squash players at the 2010 Asian Games
Squash players at the 2014 Asian Games
Squash players at the 2018 Asian Games
Medalists at the 2014 Asian Games
Sportspeople from Kuwait City